Annie Atkins is a Welsh graphic designer and prop maker for film and television. She is known for her graphic design work in The Grand Budapest Hotel (2014) and has gone on to work with director Wes Anderson on Isle of Dogs (2018) and The French Dispatch (2021).

Early life 
Atkins grew up in Dolwyddelan in Northern Wales. Her mother was an artist and her father a graphic designer. Atkins graduated with a degree in visual communications from Ravensbourne University London. After graduation, she worked as an art director in an ad campaign for McCann-Erickson in Reykjavík, Iceland. She later enrolled in Dublin City University's master in film production program after losing enthusiasm for her work at McCann-Erickson, saying “I thought I’d leave design completely, that I’d study film and be a camera operator or a technician, and then I found this whole other world of design.”

Career 
After graduating from Dublin City University, she worked as a designer on the third season of the BBC costume drama The Tudors in 2007. As the role was broadly defined, she had varying responsibilities, such as working as a stonemason, signwriter and scribe, and prop maker. After The Tudors, Atkins remained in Dublin and bounced around film jobs.

Atkins was lead graphic designer on The Grand Budapest Hotel (2014). The film won the Academy Award for Best Production Design at the 87th Academy Awards.

Atkins worked on her first video game project, "That's You!", in 2018.

She teaches workshops out of her studio in Dublin, Ireland.

Filmography

Television

Film

Bibliography 

 Fake Love Letters, Forged Telegrams, and Prison Escape Maps (2020)

References

External links 

 
 Photo gallery of Atkins' work by The Guardian

Welsh designers
Prop designers
Alumni of Dublin City University
Alumni of Ravensbourne University London
Women graphic designers
British graphic designers
Year of birth missing (living people)
Living people